Bank Houses is a hamlet in Lancashire, England.

External links

Villages in Lancashire
Geography of the City of Lancaster